Malcolm Cameron (1873 – 31 October 1954, London) was an English physician and entomologist who specialised in Coleoptera, particularly the rove beetles (Staphylinidae). He started his working life as a naval surgeon after qualifying in medicine at the London Hospital and collected beetles during his work at various locations. He is especially known for the five volumes on Staphylinidae in The Fauna of British India, Including Ceylon and Burma series. He was a Fellow of the Royal Entomological Society.

Cameron's collection is shared between the Natural History Museum in London (55,000 Staphylinidae) and the Museo Civico di Storia Naturale di Genova in Genoa, Italy.

References
Barros Machado, A. de 1959 [Cameron, M.] Publ. Cult. Comp. Diam. Angola 48 111–112.
Britton, E. B. 1954 [Cameron, M.] Entomologist's Monthly Magazine (3) 90 290.
Buxton, P. A. 1955 [Cameron, M.] Proc. R. Ent. Soc. London (C) 19 68.

External links
 NHM London
 Scanned works of Malcolm Cameron from the Oslo University Digital Library

English coleopterists
1873 births
1954 deaths
Fellows of the Royal Entomological Society
Royal Navy Medical Service officers